The Hits Album 3 or Hits 3 is a compilation album released in the UK by and WEA Records and CBS Records in  November 1985. It followed up the extremely successful previous volumes Hits 1 and Hits 2. Although those albums both reached #1, Hits 3 peaked at #2 (held off by Now 6), despite a strong track-listing including a rare appearance of a Madonna track on a compilation album and a further 20 top ten hits.

Hits 3 was a 28 track double-LP and cassette. A 22-track video compilation titled The Hits Video: Take 2 was also released on VHS by WEA Music Video.

Hits 3 features two songs which reached number one on the UK Singles Chart: "Frankie" and "The Power of Love (Jennifer Rush song)".

The Cars song "Drive" previously appeared on Hits 1.

Track listing
Record/Tape 1 Side 1 (1)
 A-ha – "Take On Me"
 King – "The Taste of Your Tears"
 Red Box – "Lean on Me (ah-li-ayo)"
 Matt Bianco – "Yeh, Yeh"
 Sister Sledge – "Frankie"
 Denise LaSalle – "My Toot Toot"
 Shakin' Stevens – "Lipstick, Powder and Paint"

Record/Tape 1 Side 2 (2)
 Madonna – "Dress You Up"
 Prince and The Revolution – "Raspberry Beret"
 Bruce Springsteen – "Dancing in the Dark"
 Steve Arrington – "Dancin' in the Key of Life"
 Brilliant – "It's a Man's Man's Man's World"
 Colonel Abrams – "Trapped"
 Eurythmics and Aretha Franklin – "Sisters Are Doin' It for Themselves"

Record/Tape 2 Side 1 (3)
 Jennifer Rush – "The Power of Love"
 Paul Young – "Everytime You Go Away"
 The Cars – "Drive" †
 Cyndi Lauper – "Time After Time"
 Sade – "The Sweetest Taboo"
 The Dream Academy – "Life in a Northern Town"
 Bonnie Tyler and Todd Rundgren – "Loving You's a Dirty Job but Somebody's Gotta Do It"

Record/Tape 2 Side 2 (4)
 John Parr – "St. Elmo's Fire (Man in Motion)"
 Huey Lewis and the News – "The Power of Love"
 ZZ Top – "Sleeping Bag"
 Bonnie Tyler – "Holding Out for a Hero"
 Thompson Twins – "King for a Day"
 The Cult – "She Sells Sanctuary"
 Echo & the Bunnymen – "Bring On the Dancing Horses"

† Previously available on Hits 1.

The Hits Video: Take 2
 A-ha – "Take On Me"
 King – "The Taste of Your Tears"
 Red Box – "Lean On Me"
 Matt Bianco – "Yeh Yeh"†
 Brilliant – "It's a Man's Man's Man's World"
 The Associates – "Take Me To the Girl"††
 Jennifer Rush – "The Power Of Love"†
 Paul Young – "Every Time You Go Away"
 Simply Red – "Holding Back the Years"††
 The Dream Academy – "Life In A Northern Town"
 Howard Jones – "Like to Get to Know You Well (new version)"†††
 Shakin' Stevens – "Lipstick, Powder and Paint"
 Bonnie Tyler – "Holding Out for a Hero"
 Dead or Alive – "My Heart Goes Bang"††
 Screaming Blue Messiahs – "Twin Cadillac Valentine"††
 The Jesus and Mary Chain – "Just Like Honey"††
 The Cult – "Rain"††
 Prefab Sprout – "When Love Breaks Down"††
 Jesse Rae – "Over the Sea"††
 Eighth Wonder – "Stay with Me"††
 Strawberry Switchblade – "Jolene"††
 Echo & the Bunnymen – "Bring On the Dancing Horses"

† Only available in mono. †† Never appeared on any Hits album. ††† Previously appeared on a Hits album.

References 
Collins Complete UK Hit Albums 1956-2005. Graham Betts. 2005. .

1985 compilation albums
CBS Records compilation albums
Warner Music Group compilation albums
Hits (compilation series) albums